The twenty-third series of the British television drama series Grange Hill began broadcasting on 25 January 2000, before ending on 30 March 2000 on BBC One. The series follows the lives of the staff and pupils of the eponymous school, an inner-city London comprehensive school. It consists of twenty episodes.

Cast

Pupils

Teachers

Others

Episodes

Production and casting
The series was filmed at BBC Elstree Centre as well as various locations in Hertfordshire.

Returning cast members included: Stuart Organ (Peter Robson, Lee Cornes (Jeff Hankin), Sally Geoghegan (Jayne Carver), Rachel Bell as (Margaret Holmes), Clive Hill (Dai "Hard" Jones), Aidan J. David (James "Arnie" Arnold), Colin Ridgewell (Colin Brown), Peter Morton (Wayne Sutcliffe, Kate Bell (Kelly Bradshaw) Laura Hammett (Sarah-Jane Webster), Diana Magness (Evelyn Wright), Oliver Elmidoro (Tom Smith), Charlotte McDonagh (Lisa West), Robert Stuart (Matt Singleton), Jonathon Marchant-Heatley (Sam "Cracker" Bacon), Sally Morton (Tracy Long), John Joseph (Ian Hudson), Michael Obiora (Max Abassi), Daniel Lee (Ben Miller), Sam Bardens (Adam Hawkins), Francesco Bruno (Franco Savi), Colin White (Spencer Hargreaves), Arnold Oceng (Calvin Braithwaite), Jalpa Patel (Anika Modi), Lindsey Ray (Amy Davenport), and Adam Sopp (Darren Clarke). Judith Wright and Emma Waters joined as sisters, Emily and Katy Fraser; Emily is a Maths teacher and Katy is a pupil, and are from Australia.

DVD release
The twenty-third series of Grange Hill has never been released on DVD as of 2014.

Notes

References

2000 British television seasons
Grange Hill